Cosmopelma is a genus of South American brushed trapdoor spiders first described by Eugène Simon in 1889.  it contains only two species, both found in Brazil.

References

Barychelidae
Mygalomorphae genera
Spiders of Brazil
Taxa named by Eugène Simon